Nambuangongo is a town and municipality in Bengo Province in Angola.

References

Populated places in Bengo Province
Municipalities of Angola